FIFA 23 is a football  video game published by Electronic Arts. It is the 29th and final installment in the FIFA series that is developed by EA Sports, and the final installment under the FIFA banner, and released worldwide on 30 September 2022 for Nintendo Switch, PlayStation 4, PlayStation 5, Windows, Xbox One and Xbox Series X/S.

Kylian Mbappé is the cover athlete for the standard and legacy editions. Mbappé shares the cover of the ultimate edition with Sam Kerr.

Listed in Guinness World Records as the best-selling sports video game franchise in the world, the game is the final under the 29-year partnership between EA and FIFA. Future football games by EA are set to be named under the banner of EA Sports FC.

Features

Crossplay 
FIFA 23 features a degree of crossplay. Crossplay is available in FIFA Ultimate Team (FUT) Division Rivals (excluding co-op), FUT Champions, FUT Ultimate Online Draft, FUT Online Friendlies (excluding Co-Op), FUT Play a Friend, Online Friendlies, Online Seasons (excluding Co-Op Seasons) and the Virtual representation of the Bundesliga. However, crossplay is limited to consoles that fall within the same console generation. For example, those on the PlayStation 4 are able to play with and against players on Xbox One, but not the PlayStation 5 or Xbox Series X/S and vice versa. Pro Clubs will not support crossplay.

The decision to omit Pro Clubs from crossplay has received criticism from the FIFA community.

HyperMotion2 and Technical Dribbling 
The game features what's being dubbed as "HyperMotion2", a system of match capture with machine learning from real life football matches to create over 6,000 in-game animations. "Technical Dribbling" uses what is being called the "Active Touch" system to improve the footballer's path to the ball and improve a player's turning and dribbling with more responsiveness. Both systems are exclusive to current-generation versions (i.e. PS5, Xbox Series X/S, Stadia and PC).

The machine learning algorithms used in HyperMotion2 are based on deep learning neural networks , which are designed to simulate the behavior of the human brain. These neural networks consist of layers of interconnected nodes that process and analyze data, allowing the system to identify patterns and make predictions based on past experience.

To train the machine learning algorithms used in HyperMotion2, EA Sports used a large dataset of football matches captured with advanced motion-capture technology. The dataset includes thousands of hours of footage, which was carefully analyzed and labeled by a team of experts to ensure the accuracy of the data.

A technique called backpropagation was used by EA Sports. Backpropagation is a technique used to adjust the parameters of a neural network to minimize the difference between the network's predictions and the actual output. In the case of HyperMotion2, backpropagation is used to adjust the parameters of the neural network to ensure that the in-game animations accurately replicate the movements of real-life players.

The machine learning algorithms used in HyperMotion2 are able to identify patterns in the data and use these patterns to create new animations that accurately replicate the movements of real-life players. The system is able to generate over 6,000 unique animations, each with its own set of variables and parameters that determine how the animation will be executed in-game.

World Cup game modes 

FIFA 23 features both men's and women's World Cup game modes, replicating the 2022 FIFA World Cup and the 2023 FIFA Women's World Cup.

The 2022 FIFA World Cup mode was released on 9 November for all platforms except for the Nintendo Switch Legacy Edition. The mode contains only two out of eight stadiums: Al Bayt and Lusail Iconic Stadium. The mode also contains each of the 32 teams that qualified for the 2022 tournament, along with fifteen other national teams that did not qualify: Austria, China, Czech Republic, Finland, Hungary, Iceland, Italy, New Zealand, Northern Ireland, Norway, Republic of Ireland, Romania, Scotland, Sweden, and Ukraine.

New icons and removed icons 
FIFA 23 features three new icons to its ICON Collection with the addition of Gerd Müller, Xabi Alonso and Jairzinho. With new addition to these three, 8 of the previously added icons are missing from the Icons List released by EA Sports. Diego Maradona, Ryan Giggs, Pep Guardiola, Deco, Marc Overmars and Filippo Inzaghi have been removed as icons for FIFA 23. Jay-Jay Okocha and Hidetoshi Nakata have been removed as icons for FIFA 23, but are now featured as heroes.

New Heroes 
FIFA 23, in an exclusive deal with Marvel, features 21 new heroes to the existing heroes collection from FIFA 22 with the additions of: Lúcio, Jean-Pierre Papin, Rudi Völler, Diego Forlán, Rafael Márquez, Javier Mascherano, Ricardo Carvalho, Tomas Brolin, Harry Kewell, Yaya Touré, Claudio Marchisio, Landon Donovan, Joan Capdevila, Sidney Govou, Dirk Kuyt, Park Ji-sung, Włodzimierz Smolarek, Saeed Al-Owairan and Peter Crouch.

Women's club football 
This entry in the FIFA video game series is the first to introduce women's club football. England's FA Women's Super League and the French Division 1 Féminine are included at launch, with more women's football leagues planned to be added later on. This comes alongside Sam Kerr, who plays for Chelsea Women, becoming the first female footballer to feature on the global front cover of the game. On 18 October 2022, EA Sports announced the inclusion of the UEFA Women's Champions League in the game for early 2023. On 6 March 2023, EA announced the addition of the UEFA Women's Champions League and the National Women's Soccer League beginning on 15 March 2023. On 14 March, EA announced the UWCL and NWSL update would be available by 23 March due to issues encountered during testing.

Licences 
FIFA 23 contains over 30 licensed leagues, over 100 licensed stadiums, over 700 clubs and more than 19,000 players. Roma, Atalanta, Lazio and Napoli are not featured in FIFA 23 due to their exclusivity agreements with rival game eFootball, and are instead known as Roma FC, Bergamo Calcio, Latium, and Napoli FC respectively. The game retains the players' likenesses, but the official badge, kits and stadiums are replaced with custom designs and generic stadiums created by EA Sports. Juventus, having been similarly absent for the past three entries and thus known as Piemonte Calcio, are featured in the game however.

The game no longer feature the teams of the J1 League, due to EA and J.League's six-year partnership coming to an end. Almost all Latin American leagues were also removed from the game, with only the Argentine Primera División remaining; the teams that contend the Copa Libertadores and Copa Sudamericana are also still present. The Russian Premier League and Belarusian Premier League were removed from the game as well, due to the ongoing Russian invasion of Ukraine.

New stadiums added to the game include the Philips Stadion, home of PSV Eindhoven, the Europa-Park Stadion, home of SC Freiburg, the Banc of California Stadium, home of Los Angeles FC, and the Academy Stadium, home of Manchester City Women. The Juventus Stadium, home of Juventus, is also added, having been absent from the past few entries due to licence issues. Nottingham Forest's home ground, the City Ground, was added post-launch via an update, thus ensuring all 20 Premier League clubs have their respective stadiums. Bayern Munich and Barcelona are also featured in the game with licensed players and kits, but do not have their stadium licenses and thus play in generic stadiums.

The game features fictional club AFC Richmond and their stadium Nelson Road from the Apple TV+ series Ted Lasso.

Reception 

FIFA 23 received "generally favorable" reviews, according to review aggregator Metacritic. The Nintendo Switch version was widely panned, with critics deriding EA for not adding any significant improvements over previous versions of the game. Writing for GamesRadar+, Ben Wilson criticized the gameplay, citing the game's pay-to-win aspects, along with moments where "player control felt sabotaged"; though stated that the series bowed out on a high and expressed encouragement for EA Sports FC scheduled for next year. Game Informer praised the title, stating that it’s “flashy, fun to play and has a lot of modes”, but criticized its similarity to previous installments of the series.

IGN game reviewer gave it a 7/10 and said "FIFA 23’s slick and dramatic virtual football is fitting for the series’ last hurrah under its long-time name, but familiar frustrations abound, and it still greatly undervalues some of its most beloved modes."

It was nominated for the British Academy Games Award for Multiplayer at the 19th British Academy Games Awards.

References 

2022 video games
23
Association football video games
Women's association football video games
EA Sports games
Video games developed in Canada
Video games developed in Romania
Video games set in 2022
Video games set in 2023
Nintendo Switch games
PlayStation 4 games
PlayStation 4 Pro enhanced games
PlayStation 5 games
Stadia games
Windows games
Xbox One games
Xbox Series X and Series S games
Frostbite (game engine) games
Sports video games with career mode